The 96th Fighter-Bomber Aviation Regiment (Serbo-Croatian: 96. lovačko-bombarderski avijacijski puk / 96. ловачко-бомбардерски авијацијски пук) was established in 1944 as the 423rd Assault Aviation Regiment (Serbo-Croatian: 423. vazduhoplovni jurišni puk / 423. ваздухопловни јуришни пук), It was formed from Yugoslav partisan aviators and trained and equipped by the Soviet Air Force.

History

423rd Assault Aviation Regiment

The unit was established on December 9 1944, in Ruma, from Yugoslav partisan aviators with the Soviet Air Force 17th Air Army's 167th Guards Assault Aviation Regiment (167.GShAP). It became independent from Soviet command and personnel in May 1945. The regiment was part of the 42nd Aviation Assault Division, and was equipped with Soviet Il-2 Shturmovik ground-attack aircraft. The regiment took part in final operations for the liberation of Yugoslavia. During combat operations it was based at Ruma, Gospođinci, Bački Brestovac, Ilinovac, Velika Gorica/Pleso and Ljubljana airfields. 

After the war the regiment moved to Pleso.

By 1948 this regiment was renamed like all other units of the Yugoslav Army, becoming the 96th Assault Aviation Regiment.

96th Assault and Fighter-Bomber Aviation Regiment
The 96th Assault Aviation Regiment was formed by renaming the 423rd Assault Aviation Regiment at Pleso airport as part of the 37th Aviation Division. By 1949 the regiment moved to Lučko near Zagreb, and in 1952 it was relocated to Cerklje, where it remained until it was disbanded. In 1954 the Il-2s were replaced by US-built F-47D Thunderbolt fighters. The regiment was renamed the 96th Fighter-Bomber Aviation Regiment (Serbo-Croatian: 96. lovačko-bombarderski avijacijski puk / 96. ловачко-бомбардерски авијацијски пук). 

It was disbanded on October 22 1959.

Assignments
42nd Aviation Assault Division (1945)
2nd Aviation Assault Division (1945–1948)
37th Aviation Division (1948–1959)

Previous designations
423rd Assault Aviation Regiment (1944-1948)
96th Assault Aviation Regiment (1948-1954)
96th Fighter-Bomber Aviation Regiment (1954-1959)

Bases stationed
Ruma (1944)
Gospođinci (1944)
Bački Brestovac (1944)
Ilinovac (1944)
Velika Gorica/Pleso (Zagreb) (1944)
Ljubljana (1945)
Pleso (1945-1949)
Lučko (1949-1951)
Cerklje (1952-1959)

Commanding officers

Aircraft
Ilyushin Il-2 (1944–1954)
P-47/F-47D Thunderbolt (1954–1959)

References

Regiments of Yugoslav Air Force
Military units and formations established in 1944
Military units and formations disestablished in 1959